Duett may refer to:

"Duett" (Rolf Løvland song), a Norwegian song
Paraavis Tango Duett, a Russian paraglider design
Volvo Duett, a Swedish automobile design